Olkhovka is a rural locality (a khutor) in Otradinsky Selsoviet, Kuyurgazinsky District, Bashkortostan, Russia. The population was 16 as of 2010. There is 1 street.

Geography 
Olkhovka is located 9 km south of Yermolayevo (the district's administrative centre) by road. Novaya Otrada is the nearest rural locality.

References 

Rural localities in Kuyurgazinsky District